or "single-minded school" is usually viewed as a small, militant offshoot from Jōdo Shinshū Buddhism though the name has a complex history.

Originally Ikkō-shū was an "obscure band of Pure Land proponents" founded by Ikkō Shunjō in the fifteenth century.  He was a disciple of Ryōchū of the Chinzei branch of Jōdo-shū Buddhism) and similar to Ippen's Ji-shū. However, when the religious and military-political establishment began to crack down on the Nembutsu, little distinction was made between the various factions. Most of Ikkō Shunjo's followers therefore defected to the more powerful Jōdo Shinshū and the name Ikkō-shū ultimately became synonymous with Jōdo Shinshū.

Rennyo, the charismatic leader of the Hongan-ji branch of Jōdo Shinshū responded to this situation by clarifying the positive religious meaning of 'Ikkō' (single-minded) whilst simultaneously distancing himself from the antinomian behaviour of the original Ikkō sect. In his pastoral letters, known as Ofumi or Gobunsho, he therefore wrote; "It has been established with certainty that our Founder did not particularly name our school the "Ikkō-shū". On the whole, the reason the people call us this is that we place our complete reliance, exclusively, on Amida Buddha ...'However, the Founder has specifically named this sect "Jōdo Shinshū". Therefore, you must understand that we of our sect did not originate in any manner or form the name of "One-Mind Sect."

Ikkō-ikki revolts

The Amida pietist movement, and in particular the Jōdo Shinshū, also provided a liberation theology (or ideology) for a wave of uprisings against the feudal system in late-fifteenth and sixteenth century Japan which are known as the Ikkō-ikki revolts. The causes of this phenomenon are disputed, but may have had both religious and socio-political causes.

As a consequence of the Ikkō-ikki revolts and the growing power of the Jōdo Shinshū, the sect's fortress-temples Ishiyama Hongan-ji and Nagashima (built at the end of the 15th century) were eventually destroyed by Oda Nobunaga's armies. The fortress at Nagashima was razed to the ground in 1574, taking about 20,000 people with it. The Ishiyama Hongan-ji withstood the longest siege in Japanese history, before surrendering in 1580. Upon its ruins, Toyotomi Hideyoshi built Osaka Castle, a replica of which stands on the site today.  Following the destruction of Nagashima, Nobunaga ordered his men to search all of Echizen Province and kill every last man and woman of the so-called Ikkō sect. Other Ikkō-shū Buddhists went underground, forming the kakure nenbutsu.

References

Further reading
 Sansom, George Bailey. (1958).  A History of Japan to 1334. Stanford: Stanford University Press. ; 
 Turnbull, Stephen (2003). Japanese Warrior Monks AD 949–1603. Oxford: Osprey Publishing. 
Abstracts of the 1995 AAS Annual Meeting Washington, DC Sacred and Secular in the Ikko Ikki

Defunct schools of Buddhism in Japan
Jōdo-shū
Jōdo Shinshū
Sengoku period
Japanese rebels
Buddhism in the Kamakura period
Buddhism in the Muromachi period
Buddhism in the Edo period